Mark Bristow MBE (born 8 July 1962) is an English paralympic cyclist. Born in Nazeing near Waltham Abbey, Essex, Bristow currently resides in Sacramento, California. He took up the sport of disability cycling after being injured in a bike crash in San Francisco in September 1997. Bristow's is a computer administrator, and is related to the darts player, Eric Bristow.

Bristow was appointed a Member of the Order of the British Empire (MBE) for services to disabled sport in the 2009 New Years Honours.

References 

1962 births
Living people
English male cyclists
Paralympic cyclists of Great Britain
Cyclists at the 2008 Summer Paralympics
Members of the Order of the British Empire
Paralympic gold medalists for Great Britain
People from Epping Forest District
Medalists at the 2008 Summer Paralympics
Paralympic medalists in cycling